Frank Dufficy (born 11 June 1953) is a British diver. He competed in the men's 10 metre platform event at the 1972 Summer Olympics.

References

1953 births
Living people
British male divers
Olympic divers of Great Britain
Divers at the 1972 Summer Olympics
Sportspeople from Hitchin